The Isuzu C (Japanese: いすゞ・C系) was an integral heavy-duty bus that was produced by Isuzu from 1980 to 1984. The range was primarily available as city bus. Its successor was Isuzu Cubic.

Models 
M = Leaf suspension, A = Air suspension.
K-CLM/CLA (1980) - DH100H engine
K-CJM/CJA (1980) - 6QA2 engine
K-CPM/CPA (1980) - E120H engine
K-CQM/CQA (1982) - 6RB2 engine

Wheelbase
470: 4.7m
500: 5.0m
520: 5.2m
550: 5.5m
600: 6.0m

See also 

 List of buses

External links 

Cab over vehicles

Isuzu buses
Vehicles introduced in 1980